Aristeidis Makrodimitris is a Greek Paralympic swimmer.  He won three medals at the 2012 Paralympic Games, two bronze in the 50m and 100m freestyle and a silver in the 50m backstroke.  He competes in the class S2.

He won the gold medal in the men's 50 metres backstroke S2 and the silver medal in the men's 100 metres backstroke S2 event at the 2018 World Para Swimming European Championships held in Dublin, Ireland. He also won the gold medal in the men's 200 metres freestyle S2 competition.

References

1991 births
Living people
Paralympic swimmers of Greece
Paralympic silver medalists for Greece
Paralympic bronze medalists for Greece
Swimmers at the 2012 Summer Paralympics
Swimmers at the 2020 Summer Paralympics
Medalists at the 2012 Summer Paralympics
Medalists at the World Para Swimming European Championships
World record holders in paralympic swimming
Paralympic medalists in swimming
Greek male backstroke swimmers
Greek male freestyle swimmers
S2-classified Paralympic swimmers